Serbia participated in the Junior Eurovision Song Contest 2020 in Warsaw, Poland. Radio Television of Serbia (RTS) selected Petar Aničić, who achieved 11th place with 85 points.

Background

In the  contest, Serbia placed 10th with Darija Vračević and the song "Podigni glas".

Before Junior Eurovision

On 25 September 2020, RTS announced that Petar Aničić would represent Serbia in the contest with the song "Heartbeat".

At Junior Eurovision
After the opening ceremony, which took place on 23 November 2020, it was announced that Serbia will perform fourth on 29 November 2020, following the Netherlands and preceding Belarus.

Voting

Detailed voting results

References

Junior Eurovision Song Contest
Serbia
2020